The Partenavia P.57 Fachiro is an Italian, four-seat, high-wing, touring monoplane, fitted with a fixed tricycle undercarriage.

Design and development
The P.57 was designed and built by Partenavia. The Lycoming O-320 powered Fachiro I first flew on 7 November 1958, followed by the Fachiro II, on 3 January 1959. A later version, designated the II-f, introduced a swept fin and rudder.

The Fachiro utilises mixed steel tube-and-fabric construction and is fitted with a  engine for aero club and general aviation use.

A one-off, all-metal version, the P.64 Fachiro III, was further developed as the P.64 Oscar.

Seven examples of the Fachiro IIf version remained in operation within Italy during spring 2009.

Variants
P.57 Fachiro I
Powered by a  Lycoming O-320 engine.
P.57 Fachiro II
Powered by a ) Lycoming O-360-B2A engine. 3 built.
P.57 Fachiro II-f
Powered by a  Lycoming O-320-A2A engine. 33 built.
P.64 Fachiro III
An all-metal version developed as the P.64 Oscar 1 built.

Specifications (Fachiro II-f)

See also

References

 

 
 

Fachiro
1950s Italian civil utility aircraft
Single-engined tractor aircraft
Aircraft first flown in 1958